Petrus Johannes "Piet" Keizer (14 June 1943 – 10 February 2017) was a Dutch professional footballer who played as a left winger.

As part of the "Total Football" Ajax Amsterdam team of the 1960s and 1970s, Keizer was particularly notable during the successive managerial tenures of Rinus Michels and Stefan Kovacs (1965–1973). He is widely considered one of the greatest players in Dutch football history. Dutch writer Nico Scheepmaker once said: "Cruyff is the best, but Keizer is the better one".

Club career 
Keizer totalled 490 official matches for Ajax, scoring 189 goals between 1961 and 1974. He played predominantly on the left-wing and with Ajax won 3 consecutive European Cups (1971, 1972, 1973), having lost the 1969 European Cup final to A.C. Milan. Also with Ajax, he won 6 Eredivisie titles, 5 KNVB Cups, 2 European Super Cups, 1 Intercontinental Cup and 1 Intertoto Cup.

In August 1973, under new Ajax manager George Knobel, the Ajax players voted in a secret ballot for Keizer to be the team's next captain, ahead of Johan Cruyff. Just weeks later Cruyff left Ajax to join Barcelona.

International career 
With the Dutch national team, Keizer played 34 times, scoring 11 goals. He made his international debut in an 8-0 friendly win against the Netherlands Antilles in 1962. Keizer was selected by Netherlands manager, Rinus Michels, to play for the Dutch squad during the 1974 FIFA World Cup, but only started in the 0-0 draw against Sweden.

Keizer suddenly retired from football in October 1974, shortly after a row over tactics with Ajax manager Hans Kraay.

Personal life 
On 13 June 1967, Keizer married Jenny Hoopman. The couple have two sons.

Keizer died after a long battle with lung cancer in February 2017.

Style of play 
UEFA website has described Keizer as "the genius on the left wing, the skillfull flanker, the superb foil to Johan Cruyff".

Cruyff, in his posthumously released autobiography, placed Keizer, as left winger, in his "ideal squad".

Honours

Club 
Ajax
Eredivisie: 1965–66, 1966–67, 1967–68, 1969–70, 1971–72, 1972–73
KNVB Cup: 1960–61, 1966–67, 1969–70, 1970–71, 1971–72
European Cup: 1970–71, 1971–72, 1972–73; runner-up: 1968–69
UEFA Super Cup: 1972, 1973
Intercontinental Cup: 1972
Intertoto Cup: 1961–62, 1968 (Group A2 winner)

International 
Netherlands
FIFA World Cup runner-up: 1974

See also 
List of one-club men

References

External links 

 

1943 births
2017 deaths
Footballers from Amsterdam
Association football wingers
Dutch footballers
Netherlands international footballers
AFC Ajax players
Eredivisie players
1974 FIFA World Cup players
Dutch sports agents
Association football agents
Deaths from lung cancer
Deaths from cancer in the Netherlands